Lita Talarico is a co-founder and co-chair of the School of Visual Arts MFA Design Program in New York City. She also co-founded the SVA Masters Workshop in Italy, an ongoing summer program. She also teaches and lectures on design entrepreneurism around the world.

Biography 
Lita received her Bachelor's degree from Empire State College, and holds a Master's in Fine Arts degree from the School of Visual Arts. She is fluent in English, Italian and French.

Work experience 
A founding associate of Bill Lacy Design, she coordinated architect selection competitions and conferences for the Cleveland Museum of Art; National World War II Memorial Design Competition; International Design Conference in Aspen; Italian Manifesto Conference; and the Pritzker Architecture Prize annual jury meeting.

Talarico was the founding managing editor of American Illustration & Photography, a board-member emeritus of Adobe Education Partners by Design, and member of the AIGA Visionary Design Council. She was a visiting scholar at the American Academy in Rome in 2008 and 2010, where she conducted extensive research on the Roman letter.

Talarico's pupils have included Deborah Adler.

Publications 
Typography Sketchbooks (Princeton Architectural Press)
The Design Entrepreneur:Turning Graphic Design into Goods that Sell (Rockport Press)
Graphic: Inside the Sketchbooks of the World’s Great Graphic Designers (Thames and Hudson)
Design School Confidential (Rockport Press)
Design Career: A Practical Guide for Beginning Illustrators and Graphic Designers (Van Nostrand Reinhold).
Design Firms Open for Business (Allworth Press)

References

Living people
American graphic designers
Women graphic designers
Empire State College alumni
School of Visual Arts alumni
School of Visual Arts faculty
Year of birth missing (living people)